Rok Vodišek (born 5 December 1998) is a Slovenian professional footballer who plays as a goalkeeper for  club Genoa.

Club career
Vodišek made his senior debut whilst on loan at Slovenian Second League club Šenčur on 13 March 2016 in a 4–1 loss to Triglav.

The following season, Vodišek returned to his parent club and made his debut for Olimpija Ljubljana on 11 September 2016 in a 1–0 win over Gorica.

On 2 July 2018, Vodišek signed with Italian Serie A club Genoa.

International career
Vodišek has represented Slovenia at under-17, under-19, and under-21 levels.

Career statistics

Notes

References

External links
Rok Vodišek profile at NZS 

1998 births
Living people
Footballers from Ljubljana
Slovenian footballers
Association football goalkeepers
Slovenian expatriate footballers
Slovenian Second League players
Slovenian PrvaLiga players
NK Olimpija Ljubljana (2005) players
Genoa C.F.C. players
NK Triglav Kranj players
Slovenian expatriate sportspeople in Italy
Expatriate footballers in Italy
Slovenia youth international footballers
Slovenia under-21 international footballers